Anisodine, also known as daturamine and α-hydroxyscopolamine, is an antispasmodic and anticholinergic drug used in the treatment of acute circulatory shock in China. It is a tropane alkaloid and is found naturally in plants of the family Solanaceae like Scopolia tanguticus Anisodine acts as a muscarinic acetylcholine receptor antagonist and α1-adrenergic receptor antagonist.

Synthesis 
(-)-Anisodine can be efficiently prepared using 6-beta-acetyltropine as the starting material via a key step of the Sharpless asymmetric dihydroxylation (AD).

See also 
 Anisodamine
 Scopolamine

References 

Alpha-1 blockers
Epoxides
Muscarinic antagonists
Tropane alkaloids
Tropane alkaloids found in Solanaceae